Rafał Augustyniak (born 14 October 1993) is a Polish professional footballer who plays as a defensive midfielder for Ekstraklasa club Legia Warsaw.

Club career
In 2018, he signed for Miedź Legnica.

On 21 June 2019, he signed with the Russian Premier League club FC Ural Yekaterinburg. Augustyniak left Ural on 31 May 2022 as his contract expired.

On 30 July 2022, he returned to Polish Ekstraklasa, signing a three-year deal with Legia Warsaw.

International career
Rafał was called up for the 2022 FIFA World Cup qualification (UEFA) matches against Hungary, Andorra and England. He made his debut for Poland against England on 31 March 2021, coming in as a substitute.

Career statistics

References

External links

 

1993 births
People from Zduńska Wola
Sportspeople from Łódź Voivodeship
Living people
Polish footballers
Poland international footballers
Association football defenders
MKP Pogoń Siedlce players
Widzew Łódź players
Jagiellonia Białystok players
Wigry Suwałki players
Miedź Legnica players
FC Ural Yekaterinburg players
Legia Warsaw players
Ekstraklasa players
I liga players
II liga players
III liga players
Russian Premier League players
Polish expatriate footballers
Expatriate footballers in Russia
Polish expatriate sportspeople in Russia